The Murphy Oil USA refinery spill was an oil spill that resulted from the failure of a storage tank at the Murphy Oil USA petroleum refinery in the residential areas of Chalmette and Meraux, Louisiana, United States, on August 30, 2005, the day after Hurricane Katrina made landfall on the U.S. Gulf Coast.

As the oil was released, it mixed with the floodwaters and flowed from east to west. Several canals were also impacted, including the 20 Arpent Canal, the 40 Arpent Canal, the Meraux Canal, the Corinne Canal, the DeLaRonde Canal, and various unnamed interceptor canals.

According to the U.S. Coast Guard, there were about 44 oil spills in the area affected by Hurricane Katrina, though most occurred in areas of Plaquemines Parish which do not have large populations. The Murphy Oil USA spill was the exception.

Preparations

Major industries in St. Bernard Parish, including the two oil refineries, had disaster mitigations plans that were filed with the local government. However, the local government lost most of its files in the flood that followed the levee failure.

Employees of oil refineries in the disaster area have stated on online forums that their refineries filled tanks with water in order to prevent them from floating away. However, typical pre-Katrina industry standards on the Gulf Coast were based on a heavy rain event, and did not anticipate a full inundation of water around the storage tanks.

Another refinery employee commented that these large oil storage tanks are sometimes purposely floated in order to move them. The containment levees around the tank are generally filled with water and tanks are moved in this way around tank farms. This is done on a planned basis with all oil removed from the tank being moved.

See also

 List of oil spills

References

External links
Murphy Oil USA official website

Oil spills in the United States
Effects of Hurricane Katrina
St. Bernard Parish, Louisiana
Disasters in Louisiana
Environment of Louisiana
2005 industrial disasters
2005 disasters in the United States
2005 in Louisiana
2005 in the environment